X-Periment is the second studio album by American band the System, released on Mirage/Atlantic Records in 1984. The album was produced by band members David Frank and Mic Murphy. It entered the Billboard pop albums chart in 1984. The album also showed a musical shift to electro music and featured songs such as "Lollipops and Everything" and "Promises Can Break."

Track listing 
All songs written by Frank and Murphy except where noted.

Production
Management: Alive Enterprises, Daniel S. Markus, Shep Gordon
Mixing: Michael Brauer, Don Wershba
Mastering: Greg Calbi, Michael Brauer
Band makeup: Denise Chaplin
Cover design: Brian Hagiwara
Recorded by Mario Salvati

Personnel
Paul Pesco - electric guitar
Mic Murphy - producer, performer, directed by, electric guitar, vocals
David Frank - producer, performer, directed by, synthesizer, digital sounds

Chart positions

References

1984 albums
The System (band) albums
Electro albums by American artists
Mirage Records albums